École supérieure d'ingénieurs de Rennes (ESIR) a French engineering College created in 2009.

The school trains engineers in two specialties: materials and information technologies.

Located in Rennes, the ESIR is a public higher education institution. The school is a member of the University of Rennes 1.

References

External links
 ESIR

Engineering universities and colleges in France
ESIR
Rennes
Educational institutions established in 2009
2009 establishments in France